Perkhuryevo is a rural locality (a village) in Kubenskoye Rural Settlement, Vologodsky District, Vologda Oblast, Russia. The population was 8 as of 2002.

Geography 
The distance to Vologda is 38 km.

References 

Rural localities in Vologodsky District